Thomas Page (15 November 1888 – 26 October 1973) was an English footballer and international baseball player. Three of his brothers, Louis, Jack and Willie, were also professional footballers.

Career
Page played for Carada, Pembroke, and Rochdale, before spending six weeks at Everton in 1913. He then moved on to St Mirren, and guested for South Liverpool during World War I. He had a trial with Liverpool before joining Port Vale for £400 in June 1920. He hit nine goals in 41 appearances in 1920–21, including one in the 2–1 Potteries derby victory over Stoke at The Old Recreation Ground on 25 September, the club's first league goal against Stoke.

He was top scorer in the 1921–22 season with 10 goals in 39 games, helping the team to share the North Staffordshire Infirmary Cup in 1922. He also scored another goal against Stoke on 7 January, in a 4–2 defeat in the FA Cup First Round tie at the Victoria Ground. However, he struck just once in 26 games in 1922–23. For the 1923–24 season he was joint-top scorer with Billy Briscoe, hitting ten goals in 39 games. He continued to be a bogey player for the "Potters", scoring in another 4–2 defeat on 13 October. He hit five goals in 29 appearances in 1924–25, as Vale finished eighth in the Second Division.

By 1925–26, Wilf Kirkham was the club's number one goal threat, though Page still managed to score 10 goals in 37 appearances. It was much the same story in 1926–27 and 1927–28, as he bagged 10 goals for three seasons running. However, he was goalless in his seventeen appearances in the 1928–29 season, as the club were relegated into the Third Division North. Now at the age of 40, he was released, having played 302 games (286 in the league) and scored 65 goals (59 in the league) for the club. He still continued his career though, signing a contract with New Brighton, also of the Third Division North.

Career statistics
Source:

Honours
Port Vale
North Staffordshire Infirmary Cup: 1922

References

1888 births
1973 deaths
Footballers from Liverpool
Players of British baseball
English footballers
Association football forwards
Rochdale A.F.C. players
Everton F.C. players
St Mirren F.C. players
Port Vale F.C. players
New Brighton A.F.C. players
English Football League players